Pontdolgoch is a very small village in Powys, Wales. The River Carno flows through the village.

Pontdolgoch's name translates as "bridge over the red meadow", and is derived from an ancient, and bloody, battle.

Pontdolgoch is also home of the Coaching inn, the Talkhouse, also known by its Welsh name Ty Siarad.

The village was previously served by Pontdolgoch railway station on the Cambrian Line.

References

External links
Photos of Pontdolgoch and surrounding area on Geograph
Its entry in Welshpedia

Villages in Powys
Caersws